Alfio Fontana (November 7, 1932 – February 4, 2005) was an Italian professional footballer who played as a midfielder.

Club career
Fontana played for 13 seasons (318 games, 8 goals) in the Italian Serie A for A.C. Milan, U.S. Triestina Calcio, A.S. Roma and U.C. Sampdoria.

International career
Fontana made 3 appearances for the Italy national football team between 1957 and 1960.

Honours
Milan
 Serie A champion: 1954–55, 1956–57, 1958–59.

Roma
 Inter-Cities Fairs Cup winner: 1960–61.

External links
 

1932 births
2005 deaths
Italian footballers
Serie A players
A.C. Milan players
U.S. Triestina Calcio 1918 players
A.S. Roma players
U.C. Sampdoria players
Casale F.B.C. players
Italy international footballers
Association football midfielders